Lyndon Mauriece Hardy is an American physicist, fantasy author, and business owner.

Biography
Hardy is a member of the Science Fiction Writers of America.  He attended California Institute of Technology as an undergraduate and the University of California Berkeley for his Ph.D.

In his college years, he became fascinated with fantasy literature. In addition to being a fantasy author, he worked for 30 years at the aerospace company TRW, and started a computer consulting company named Alodar Systems Inc. that, among other things, helped develop intelligence tools for medical research and enterprise resource planning software for small businesses. He is married and has two daughters.

In 1961, Hardy masterminded the Great Rose Bowl Hoax, in which Caltech students rearranged the cards used by Washington to spell out words during halftime.

Bibliography

Magic by the Numbers
 Master of the Five Magics (1980), reissued in modified form in 2016
 Secret of the Sixth Magic (1984), reissued in modified form in 2016
 Riddle of the Seven Realms (1988), reissued in modified form in 2016
 The Archimage's Fourth Daughter (2017)
 Magic Times Three (2020)
 Double Magic (2020)

 "Double Magic" (2019; novelette; Island Magic #1)

References

External links
 Alodar Systems
 

1941 births
20th-century American novelists
American male novelists
American science fiction writers
California Institute of Technology alumni
Living people
20th-century American male writers